Nordea Bank Danmark A/S is a bank in Denmark. It is part of Nordea - the largest financial group in the Nordic countries. Nordea is the result of a merger in 1997 between the Danish bank Unibank, which itself was an amalgamation of older Danish banks, most notable Sparekassen SDS, and banks from other Nordic countries.

External links
 Official Website

References

Banks of Denmark
Banks established in 1997
Financial services companies based in Copenhagen
1997 establishments in Denmark
Companies based in Copenhagen Municipality

da:Nordea